This is a list of events in Scottish television from 1968.

Events
1 April - Debut of BBC Scotland's national news programme Reporting Scotland.
Unknown - 
Scottish Television introduces afternoon programming as its licence remit increases by three and a half hours a week.
All three of Scotland's ITV contractors retain their franchises in the latest round of franchise decisions.
Debut of current affairs programme Current Account.

Debuts

BBC
1 April - Reporting Scotland on BBC 1 (1968–1983; 1984–present)

Television series
Scotsport (1957–2008)
Dr. Finlay's Casebook (1962–1971)
The Adventures of Francie and Josie (1962–1970)

Ending this year

The White Heather Club (1958–1968)

Births

13 October - Alex Ferns, actor
23 November - Kirsty Young, journalist and television presenter
Unknown - Gray O'Brien, actor
Unknown - Sarah Smith, news reporter

See also
1968 in Scotland

References

 
Television in Scotland by year
1960s in Scottish television